Robert Anthony Cremins (February 15, 1906 – March 27, 2004) was a pitcher in Major League Baseball who played briefly for the Boston Red Sox during the 1927 season. He was born in Pelham Manor, New York.

In four relief appearances, Cremins posted a 5.04 earned run average without a decision in 5  ⅓  Innings pitched. According to Baseball Almanac, Cremins faced Babe Ruth once and retired him on a grounder to first base. His career ended in 1928 due to an arm injury.

Following his baseball career, Cremins served in the military during World War II. After that, he worked as town supervisor and tax receiver for Pelham.

Cremins died in his homeland of Pelham at the age of 98. At the time of his death, he was the second-oldest surviving person having been a baseball player; Ray Cunningham is No. 1.

Fact
Nicknamed "Lefty" or "Crooked Arm"

References

External links
Baseball Almanac

Historic Baseball
Retrosheet

Boston Red Sox players
Major League Baseball pitchers
United States Army Air Forces personnel of World War II
Baseball players from New York (state)
1906 births
2004 deaths
People from Pelham Manor, New York
United States Army Air Forces officers
Burials at Holy Sepulchre Cemetery (New Rochelle, New York)
Wilkes-Barre Barons (baseball) players
Akron Tyrites players
Springfield Ponies players